Katrine Hvidsteen (born 16 February 1977) is a Danish alpine skier. She competed in two events at the 1998 Winter Olympics.

References

1977 births
Living people
Danish female alpine skiers
Olympic alpine skiers of Denmark
Alpine skiers at the 1998 Winter Olympics
Place of birth missing (living people)